The 1963 Holy Cross Crusaders football team was an American football team that represented the College of the Holy Cross as an independent during the 1963 NCAA University Division football season. Eddie Anderson returned for the 14th consecutive year as head coach, his 20th year overall. The team compiled a record of 2–6–1.

All home games were played at Fitton Field on the Holy Cross campus in Worcester, Massachusetts.

Schedule

Statistical leaders
Statistical leaders for the 1963 Crusaders included: 
 Rushing: Jim Marcellino, 406 yards and 1 touchdown on 105 attempts
 Passing: Fran Coughlin, 486 yards, 36 completions and 3 touchdowns on 79 attempts
 Receiving: Jim Marcellino, 277 yards and 1 touchdown on 21 receptions
 Scoring: Fran Coughlin and Jim Gravel (tie), each with 14 points from 2 touchdowns and 1 two-point conversion
 Total offense: Fran Coughlin, 517 yards (486 passing, 31 rushing)
 All-purpose yards: Jim Marcellino, 939 yards (406 rushing, 277 receiving, 256 returning)

References

Holy Cross
Holy Cross Crusaders football seasons
Holy Cross Crusaders football